Ron McKenzie may refer to:

 Ron McKenzie (footballer) (born 1930), Australian footballer
 Ron McKenzie (tennis), New Zealand tennis player